Barbieri is an Italian surname. Notable people with the surname include:

 Alberto Barbieri (academic), Argentine academic
 Antonio María Barbieri (1892–1979), Uruguayan Cardinal
 Anthony Barbieri (born 1963), American writer and performer
 Domenico del Barbieri (c.1506–1570), Italian artist
 Fedora Barbieri (1920–2003), Italian singer
 Francesco Barbieri (1623–1698), Italian painter
 Francisco Asenjo Barbieri (1823–1894), Spanish composer
 Gato Barbieri (1932–2016), Argentine saxophone player
 Gian Paolo Barbieri, Photographer
 Giovanni Francesco Barbieri (1591–1666), Italian painter known as Guercino
 Lara Barbieri (born 1986), Italian footballer 
 Marcello Barbieri (born 1940), Italian theoretical biologist
 Melissa Barbieri (born 1980), Australian football goalkeeper
 Olivo Barbieri (born 1954), Italian artist
 Rachele Barbieri (born 1997), Italian cyclist
 Ralph Barbieri (1946–2020), American sports radio personality
 Ray Barbieri (20th century), American musician
 Renzo Barbieri (1940–2007), Italian author
 Richard Barbieri (born 1957), English musician
 Robert Barbieri (born 1984), Canadian-born Italian rugby player
 Sante Uberto Barbieri (1902–?), Italian Bishop

See also
 Robert Barbers  (1944-2005), Filipino politician; his surname was originally spelled Barbieri
 Angus Barbieri's fast

Italian-language surnames